Axel Médéric (born 29 May 1970 in Créteil, France) is a former French figure skater who competed in men's singles.  In 1988, he won the silver medal at the French Figure Skating Championships and placed fifteenth at the 1988 Winter Olympics.  The following year, he captured the French national title, finished seventh at the European Figure Skating Championships, and placed thirteenth at the World Figure Skating Championships.

Results

References
 

French male single skaters
Olympic figure skaters of France
Figure skaters at the 1988 Winter Olympics
1970 births
Living people